Hirtenbach may refer to:

 Hirtenbach (Bühler), a river of Baden-Württemberg, Germany
 Hirtenbach (Wetter), a river of Hesse, Germany